Gnomidolon sylvarum is a species of beetle in the family Cerambycidae. It was described by Bates in 1892.

References

Gnomidolon
Beetles described in 1892